The Choluteca River is a river in southern Honduras. Its source is in the Department of Francisco Morazán, near Lepaterique (south-west Tegucigalpa), and from there it flows north through the city of Tegucigalpa, then south through the department of El Paraíso, and the department and city of Choluteca.  The mouth of the river—located among wetland—is near the coastal town of Cedeño, on the Gulf of Fonseca.

It increases its volume between May and October, together with the rainy season. Its basin is affected by severe drought together with the El Niño phenomenon, and this is usually associated with severe bush fires.

There are no dams built along the main course of the river to leave it to its natural health.

The flooding of this river was a major source of destruction during Hurricane Mitch in 1998.  It washed out entire neighborhoods in Tegucigalpa, and eventually swelled to six times its normal size in Choluteca.  There it destroyed neighborhoods and part of the commercial center. Further down it also devastated the tiny Morolica, destroying the entire hamlet, requiring the town to be rebuilt three miles upriver. The hurricane also rerouted the river, which was no longer flowing beneath the New Choluteca Bridge.

See also 

 Rivers of Honduras
 Water Resources Management: The Choluteca river basin in Honduras
 Water Resources Management in Honduras

References

Choluteca